An air-launched ballistic missile or ALBM is a ballistic missile launched from an aircraft. An ALBM allows the launch aircraft to stand off at long distances from its target, keeping it well outside the range of defensive weapons like anti-aircraft missiles and interceptor aircraft. Historically, once launched the missile was essentially immune to interception due to a lack of capable anti-ballistic missiles, with those few that did exist being limited to known static positions. This combination of features allowed a strategic bomber to present a credible deterrent second-strike option in an era when improving anti-aircraft defences appeared to be rendering conventional bombers obsolete. However, by the 1990's surface-to-air missile technology had innovated to the point of allowing the interception of such weapons (especially in their terminal phase) from road mobile systems, albeit at a lower PoK. By the early 21st century capable, dedicated, ALBM systems from several nations had been deployed in significant numbers (with examples including upgraded MIM-104 Patriot and S-300, THAAD, SM-3, and S-400), spurring further innovation in hypersonic glide vehicles to penetrate such systems and keep ballistic missiles capable.

The ALBM concept was studied in the US as a way to ensure the usefulness and survivability of their large bomber fleet. The only other major force relying on strategic bombers was the Royal Air Force, who also selected the Skybolt to arm their V bomber fleet. The Soviet Union moved their strategic force directly to Intercontinental Ballistic Missiles.

Skybolt ultimately failed several key tests, while the US Navy's UGM-27 Polaris offered the same advantages and more. Skybolt was cancelled, leading to the Skybolt crisis and an agreement to sell Polaris to the Royal Navy as part of the Nassau Agreement. The concept saw little active development until the 1970s when ICBM warheads began to become accurate enough to attack other ICBMs while they were still on the ground. The US carried out several experiments using existing missile designs dropped from cargo aircraft, but ultimately abandoned this line of research entirely. No further strategic ALBM development has been carried out by the US, and this class of missile never saw active use.

High Virgo

WS-199B Bold Orion

Developed by Martin Aircraft, the Bold Orion missile was an air-launched ballistic missile, launched from the B-47 Stratojet medium bomber, with flight tests being carried out in 1958 and 1959. Early launches of the Bold Orion as a single-stage vehicle were unsuccessful, however a redesign as a two-stage weapon produced improved results, with the remainder of the 12-launch series establishing the ALBM as a viable vehicle. The final test flight trialed the Bold Orion missile as an anti-satellite missile, passing within  of Explorer VI, the first-ever interception of a satellite.

GAM-87 Skybolt

The GAM-87 Skybolt, intended to be launched from Boeing B-52 Stratofortress and Avro Vulcan bombers, was in development by the United States Air Force, with the United Kingdom as a customer. In 1962, with technical difficulties and costs mounting, the program was cancelled, with the United States and the UK concentrating on the UGM-27 Polaris submarine-launched ballistic missile instead.

Air Mobile Feasibility test: C-5 w/ LGM-30
 In the early 1970s, the USAF tested air-launching a Minuteman 1b ICBM from a C-5A Galaxy transport aircraft. On 24 October 1974, the Space and Missile Systems Organization successfully conducted an Air Mobile Feasibility test where a C-5A Galaxy aircraft air-dropped the 86,000-pound missile from 20,000 feet over the Pacific Ocean. The missile fell to 8,000 feet before its rocket engine fired. The 10-second engine burn carried the missile to 20,000 feet again before it dropped into the ocean. The test proved the feasibility of launching an intercontinental ballistic missile from the air. Operational deployment was discarded due to engineering and security difficulties, though the capability was used as a negotiating point in the Strategic Arms Limitation Talks.

Kh-47M2 Kinzhal

It is suspected to be a version of the Iskander missile. Earlier Soviet aero-ballistic missiles have a much shorter range, e.g. In March 2022, the Kinzhal was used for the first time in combat by Russia in Ukraine during its invasion of the country.

Chinese DF-21 and DF-17

In March 2018, Defense Intelligence Agency chief Robert Ashley confirmed that China is developing two new air-launched ballistic missiles, one of which can carry a nuclear warhead. The H-6K bomber would be suited to launch such missiles. One of these missiles is a derivative of the DF-21 called the CH-AS-X-13 and has a range of 3,000 km.

In October 2020, a H-6 bomber was spotted at Neixiang Air Base landing with what appeared to be an air-launched ballistic missile similar to the DF-17.

Air-launched ballistic training missiles
The Israeli Sparrow target missile is used to test the Arrow anti-ballistic missile system.

See also
 Air-launched cruise missile

References

External links
 Air-launched Minuteman ICBM
 B-58 Hustler ALBM flight test program - US Air Force documentary film, 1959 (Progress Report #1 - Convair, 1958)

Missile types